The acronym AAFD may stand for:

 American Association of Franchisees and Dealers
 Arab Alliance for Freedom and Democracy